OD600 (Also written as O.D. 600, D600, o.d. 600, OD600) is an abbreviation indicating the optical density of a sample measured at a wavelength of 600 nm. It is a commonly used in Spectrophotometry for estimating the concentration of bacteria or other cells in a liquid as the 600nm wavelength does little to damage or hinder their growth. Optical density is largely based on light scattering and should not be confused with absorption.

Measuring the concentration can indicate the growth stage of cultured cell population, i.e. whether it is in the lag phase, log phase, or stationary phase. This is done by measuring the absorbance of the OD600 light with the use of a Spectrophotometer. A growth curve can then be constructed by taking absorbance measurements as a function of time.

OD600 is preferable to UV spectroscopy when measuring the growth over time of a cell population because at this wavelength, the cells will not be killed as they would under too much UV radiation. UV radiation has also been shown to cause small to medium-sized mutations in bacteria, potentially altering or destroying genes of interest.

OD600 is a type of turbidity measurement.

References

Absorption spectroscopy